The Law on Cooperatives was a major economic reform implemented in the Soviet Union during General Secretary Mikhail Gorbachev's perestroika and glasnost reforms. It was implemented in May 1988, allowed for independent worker-owned cooperatives to operate in the Soviet Union, as opposed to just state-owned enterprises, and gave guidelines as to how these cooperatives should be managed.
While originally the law imposed high taxes and restrictions on employment, it was eventually revised so as not to discourage activity within the private sector.

See also
 History of the Soviet Union (1982–91)
 Perestroika
 Uskoreniye
 Glasnost
 Demokratizatsiya (Soviet Union)
 Enterprises in the Soviet Union
 Economy of the Socialist Federal Republic of Yugoslavia
 Market socialism
 Titoism
 Workers' self-management

References

Economic history of the Soviet Union
Soviet law
1988 in the Soviet Union
Cooperatives
Cooperatives in the Soviet Union
Market socialism
Mikhail Gorbachev